is a Japanese Iaido master (Shūshinryū Iaijutsu hyōhō, Shūshin-kan head master) in Kawanishi, Hyōgo, Japan. 

He holds a number of Guinness World Records for his katana skills, including "Most martial arts katana cuts to one mat (suegiri)", "Fastest 1,000 martial arts sword cuts", "Most sword cuts to straw mats in three minutes", and "Fastest tennis ball (708km/h) cut by sword".

References

External links
  Modern Samurai Isao Machii - Stan Lee's Superhumans, History Channel.
 Official website of Shūshinryū Iaijutsu hyōhō, Shūshin-kan 

1973 births
Living people
Japanese swordfighters